Oleshky Sands National Nature Park is a national park of Ukraine, located south of the lower Dnieper River about 25 km east of the regional city of Kherson, and 70 km northwest of the Crimean Peninsula. The park features expanses of low-fertility soil and sand, and a variety of unusual microhabitats. The area is not a true desert, but rather semi-arid. As of 2019, visits by unaccompanied members of the public were strictly prohibited, with warnings that the area was next to a military training ground. The park is located in Kakhovka Raion of Kherson Oblast.

Topography

The park is located on the north slope of the Black Sea Basin. It is divided into two main zones: 
 Radensk. The largest area, notable for the absence of pine forest stands, and for large sand dunes in the center. (6,780 ha)
 Burkut. An area of pine forest, meadows and lakes surrounded by sandy steppe.  (1,240 ha)

Climate and ecoregion

Oleshky Sands is located in the Pontic–Caspian steppe ecoregion, a region that covers an expanse of grasslands stretching from the northern shores of the Black Sea to western Kazakhstan.

Flora and fauna
The landscape is quite varied, with sandy-steppe, semi-arid steppe, meadows, reed beds, and forest stands.  The dunes of the Radensk sector are interspersed with patches of shrubs, lakes and birch groves (12% of the area).

Public use
The parks website warns the public of danger from a nearby military installation, and strictly prohibits unaccompanied visits by members of the public.

References

External links
 Borders of Oleshky Sands National Park on OpenStreetMap.org

National parks of Ukraine